St. John Neumann High School (often abbreviated to SJN) is a co-educational private, Roman Catholic high school in Naples, Florida.  It is located in the Roman Catholic Diocese of Venice in Florida. The school is named after Saint John Neumann, the fourth bishop of Philadelphia and considered to be a pioneer in Catholic Education, and guided by the educational ethos of Blessed Edmund Rice and the Christian Brothers.

History
St. John Neumann High School was founded in 1980 under the auspices of the Augustinian Fathers. The inaugural freshman class of 27 students were taught in temporary facilities at nearby St. Elizabeth Ann Seton Catholic Church until the school building was completed in the Golden Gate community of Naples. It included twelve class rooms, laboratories, administrative offices, and a gym. Stewardship was later passed to the Congregation of Christian Brothers. Enrollment increased through the 1990s, and due to the challenges of limited space a second wing was added to the school in 1997, which included five new classrooms, a computer lab, a small chapel, a library and media center, and administrative offices. A science center with new biology labs was added in 2009.

Performance
100% graduation rate.
Over 98% of graduates have been admitted to college each year.

Notes and references

External links
 School Website

Catholic secondary schools in Florida
Congregation of Christian Brothers secondary schools
High schools in Collier County, Florida
Buildings and structures in Naples, Florida
Roman Catholic Diocese of Venice in Florida
1980 establishments in Florida
Educational institutions established in 1980